Salmon Oliver Levinson (1865 – 1941) was a practicing attorney who specialized in industrial organizations and corporate law.  He was active in the peace movement in the 1920s and was responsible for drafting the Kellogg–Briand Pact, signed in 1928.  Levinson noted: "We should have, not as now, laws of war, but laws against war; just as there are no laws of murder or of poisoning, but laws against them.” The treaty was the first international agreement to make war illegal. The treaty commits the parties to "condemn recourse to war for the solution of international controversies, and renounce it, as an instrument of national policy" and agree that all disputes should be settled peacefully.

References

Citations

Cited sources

External links
 Guide to the Salmon Levinson Papers 1905-1998 at the University of Chicago Special Collections Research Center

1865 births
1941 deaths
Corporate lawyers
American lawyers
American anti-war activists